Siburan District is a district under the Serian Division, Sarawak, Malaysia. The district was elevated from sub-district status in November 2021.

References

Districts of Sarawak
Serian Division